Said Abadou (عبادو السعيـد) ( 1935 - 12 June 2019) was the Algerian minister for war veterans in the 1995 government of Mokdad Sifi.

References 

Year of birth missing
Algerian politicians
1930s births
2019 deaths
21st-century Algerian people